Grove City Airport  is a public airport  west of Grove City, in Mercer County, Pennsylvania.

References

External links 

Airports in Pennsylvania
Transportation buildings and structures in Mercer County, Pennsylvania